Peter Miller (born 26 May 1942, Norwich, England), also known as "Big Boy Pete", is an English singer, songwriter, recording engineer and record producer.

Born in Norwich, England, he has lived in San Francisco since 1972. He is a veteran of the 1960s English pop music, starting out with a rock & roll band called the Offbeats, who recorded an EP in 1958, and joining the beat group Peter Jay & the Jaywalkers in 1961.

He has toured with The Beatles, The Rolling Stones, and most of the rest of the British Invasion. He released one of the first English psychedelic songs ("Cold Turkey") which placed his name in the Rock and Roll Hall of Fame. A copy of "Cold Turkey" sold for £250 at Sotheby's Rock and Roll auction in London.

His 1965 record "Baby I Got News for You" on Columbia Records is also a sought-after collector's item. David Wells, owner of the British archival Tenth Planet record label has released four albums of Miller's 1960s music. They have been released by Dionysus Records and Gear Fab Records in the U.S. Recent releases are also on Raucous Records and Double Crown records. His recording studio in San Francisco recorded the early San Francisco punk scene. Miller is also the founder and CEO of the Audio Institute of America, an online recording engineer school which has taught thousands of students from more than 130 countries around the world.

Discography

 1958 Introducing the Offbeats – Peter Miller & the Offbeats (EP) Magnegraph Records (Lead Guitar/Songwriter)
 1962 "Ever Since You Said Goodbye" – Marty Wilde (single) Philips 326546 (Lead Guitar)
 1962 "Can Can 62" / "Redskins" – Peter Jay & the Jaywalkers (single) Decca 11531 (Lead Guitar)
 1963 "Totem Pole" / "Jaywalker" – Peter Jay & the Jaywalkers (single) Decca 11593 (Lead Guitar)
 1963 "Poet and Peasant" / "Ooh Lala!" – Peter Jay & the Jaywalkers (single) Decca 11659 (Lead Guitar)
 1964 "Kansas City" / "Parade of the Tin Soldiers" – Peter Jay & the Jaywalkers (single) Decca 11840 (Lead Guitar/Vocal)
 1964 "If You Love Me" / "You Girl" – Peter Jay & the Jaywalkers (single) Decca 11917 (Lead Guitar/Vocal)
 1964 "Where Did Our Love Go" / "Caroline" – Peter Jay & the Jaywalkers (single) Piccadilly 35199 (Lead Guitar/Vocal)
 1964 "Tonight You're Gonna Fall" / "Red Cabbage" – Peter Jay & the Jaywalkers (single) Piccadilly 35212 (Lead Guitar/Vocal)
 1964 "Kansas City" – Peter Jay & the Jaywalkers (compilation album: Ready Steady Go!) Decca 4577 (Lead Guitar/Vocal)
 1965 "Parchman Farm" / "What Two Can Easily Do" – Peter Jay & the Jaywalkers (single) Piccadilly 35220 (Vocal/Lead Guitar)
 1965 "Before The Beginning" / "Solitaire" – Peter Jay & the Jaywalkers (single) Piccadilly 35259 (Lead Guitar/Songwriter)
 1965 "The Entertainer" / "I Count the Tears" – The News (single) Decca 12356 (Lead Guitar)
 1965 Spectre/Solitaire – Sounds Orchestral (album) Piccadilly 38016 (Composer)
 1966 "Baby I Got News For You" / "Girl with the Castle" – Peter Miller (single) Columbia 7972 (Vocal/Lead Guitar/Composer)
 1966 "Stop!" – The Knack (single) Polydor 602005 (Composer)
 1966 "The Baby Song" – Boz (single) Columbia 7735 (Composer)
 1966 "Rumpelstiltskin" – The Magic Lanterns (single) CBS 202250 (Lead Guitar)
 1967 "Stop!" – Dan et Vanny (single) Barclay 71080 (Composer)
 1968 "Cold Turkey" / "My Love is Like a Spaceship" – Big Boy Pete (single) Camp Records 602005 (Vocal/Lead Guitar/Composer)
 1968 "Playboy" – Freddie and the Dreamers (single) Columbia 7929 (Composer)
 1974 Music From Little Flint – Pete Miller (album) .22 Records TT2201 (Vocal/Lead Guitar/Composer)
 1978 "Can Can 62" / "Totem Pole" – Peter Jay & the Jaywalkers (compilation album: The Joe Meek Story) Decca 19076 (Lead Guitar)
 1979 "I Hate Disco Music" – Marshall Crenshaw (single) Loral 001 (Backing Vocalist)
 1981 Pre C.B.S. – Peter Miller (album) .22 Records TT2202 (Vocal/Lead Guitar/Composer)
 1983 "Can Can 62" – Peter Jay & the Jaywalkers (compilation album: The Decca Originals Volume 4) Decca TAB65 (Lead Guitar)
 1983 "Can Can 62" – Peter Jay & the Jaywalkers (compilation album: Twenty One Hit Wonders) See For Miles Records CM124 (Lead Guitar)
 1984 "Cold Turkey" – Naz Nomad and the Nightmares (album track) Bigbeat WIK21 (Composer)
 1986 Rockin' is My Bizness – Peter Miller (album) .22 Records TT2203 (Vocal/Lead Guitar/Composer)
 1989 "Baby I Got News for You" – Peter Miller (compilation album: English Freakbeat Volume 3) Archive International AIP10048 (Vocal/Lead Guitar/Composer)
 1995 "Double Diamonds" – Shig & Buzz (single) Maitai DD0103 (Lead Guitar/Composer)
 1995 "Spectre" – Shig & Buzz (compilation album: Secret Agent Sounds) Maitai DD0118 (Lead Guitar/Composer)
 1995 "Swept Away" – Shig & Buzz (compilation album: 21st. Century Surf Sounds) Orange ORA1007 (Lead Guitar/Composer)
 1996 "Good Luck Charm" – Shig & Buzz (single) Sheena Music MCE38 (Lead Guitar/Composer)
 1996 Homage to Catatonia – Big Boy Pete (album) Tenth Planet TP026 (Vocal/Lead Guitar/Composer)
 1997 Summerland – Peter Miller (album) Tenth Planet TP030 (Vocal/Lead Guitar/Composer)
 1997 Homage to Catatonia – Big Boy Pete (album) Bacchus Archives BA1123 (Vocal/Lead Guitar/Composer)
 1998 Return to Catatonia – Big Boy Pete (album) Tenth Planet TP035 (Vocal/Lead Guitar/Composer)
 1999 "Baby I Got News For You" – Peter Miller (compilation album: The Story of Oak Records) Wooden Hill WHCD007 (Vocal/Lead Guitar/Composer)
 1999 "Baby I Got News For You" – The Bristols (track from – Tune In with...) Damaged Goods 193CD (Composer)
 1999 "Me" / "Nasty Nazi" – Big Boy Pete (single) 3 Acre Floor Records 3eeAC05 (Vocal/Lead Guitar/Composer)
 1999 "Psycho-Relics" – Big Boy Pete (single) Bacchus Archives BA 1137 (Vocal/Lead Guitar/Composer)
 1999 Return to Catatonia – Big Boy Pete (album) Gear Fab Records GF-139 (Vocal/Lead Guitar/Composer)
 2000 Summerland – Pete Miller (album) Gear Fab Records GF-147(Vocal/Lead Guitar/Composer)
 2000 World War IV... A Symphonic Poem – Big Boy Pete (album) Gear Fab Records GF-157(Vocal/Lead Guitar/Composer)
 2001 World War IV... A Symphonic Poem – Big Boy Pete (album) Comet Records GFC-414 (Vocal/Lead Guitar/Composer)
 2002 London American Boy – Big Boy Pete (album) Raucous Records RAUCD-105 (Vocal/Lead Guitar)
 2002 Big Boy Pete Treats – The Squires of the Subterrain (album) Rocket Racket Records RRCD-209 (Composer/Producer)
 2002 Strawberries on Sunday – The Squires of the Subterrain (album) Rocket Racket Records RRCD-210 (Co-Producer)
 2003 Great British Rock 'N' Roll and Rockabilly Collection – Vol. 3 – Big Boy Pete (compilation album) Raucous Records RAUCD-120(Vocal)
 2004 The Margetson Demos – Big Boy Pete (album) Gear Fab Records GF-206 (Vocal/Lead Guitar/Composer)
 2005 Rock-Ola – Bonney & Buzz (album) Double Crown Records DCCD-20 (Lead Guitar/Composer)
 2006 The Perennial Enigma – Big Boy Pete (album) Angel Air SJPCD-224 (Vocal/Lead Guitar/Composer)
 2007 Rock It Racket – The Squires of the Subterrain and Big Boy Pete (album) Rocket Racket Records RRCD2112 (Vocal/Lead Guitar)
 2007 Seasonal Favorites Vol.2 – Big Boy Pete (compilation album) Double Crown Records DCCD28 (Vocal/Guitar)
 2008 Bang It Again! – Bonney & Buzz (album) Double Crown Records DCCD29 (Guitar)
 2010 Bark! - Big Boy Pete (CD) .22 Records TT2203-A (Lead Guitar/Composer)
 2010 Winklepickin - Big Boy Pete and the Offbeats skiffle group (CD) .22 Records TT2204 (Guitar/Banjo//Vocals/Composer)
 2010 Be Dreamers - Kelley Stoltz (CD) Sub Pop Records SP890 (Guitar/Composer/Producer of one track)
 2012 Merry Skifflemas! - Big Boy Pete and Hilton Valentine (CD) .22 Records TT2205 (Vocals/Guitar/Composer)
 2012 Jaywalkin''' - Peter Jay and the Jaywalkers (CD) Cherry Red Records, Retro 906 (Lead Guitar/Composer)
 2012 Play Rough - Bonney & Buzz (CD) Double Crown Records DCCD 47 (Guitars/Composer)
 2012 Cold Turkey - Big Boy Pete (CD) Gear Fab Records GF 258 (Vocals/Guitars/Composer)
 2013 Hitmen - Big Boy Pete and The Squire (CD) Rocket Racket Records RRCD221 (Vocals/Guitars/Composer)
 2013 Through The Back Door - Big Boy Pete (CD) 22 Records TT-2206 (Vocals/Guitars/Composer)
 2016 Miller's Tales'' - Big Boy Pete (DVD) 22 Records TT-2207 (Vocals/Guitars/Composer)

References

1942 births
Living people
English male singers
English rock guitarists
English pop guitarists
English male guitarists
English songwriters
English record producers
Musicians from Norwich
British male songwriters